Eucosma agnatana is a species of moth of the family Tortricidae. It is found in China (Hebei, Shanxi, Inner Mongolia, Shaanxi, Qinghai), Mongolia, Russia, Kazakhstan, Romania, Russia and the Near East.

The wingspan is 13–17 mm. Adults are on wing from August to September.

The larvae feed on Artemisia fragrans, Artemisia nutans and Artemisia monogyna.

References

Moths described in 1872
Eucosmini